Kevin Payne (born December 5, 1983) is a former American football safety. He was drafted by the Chicago Bears in the fifth round of the 2007 NFL Draft. He played college football at Louisiana-Monroe.

He has also been a member of the St. Louis Rams and Carolina Panthers.

Early years
Payne's journey to stardom began back in Junction City, where he was a three-sport standout. His senior year was a breakout season tallying in over 1,700 yards, rushing with 26 touchdowns offensively, 104 tackles with 1 interception, and 1 fumble—both being returned for a touchdown. Though Payne's passion was football, he also played basketball admitted he never took basketball as seriously as he did football, he still averaged 18 points a game his senior year. According to Payne, his first love was baseball and was his primary sport until the 8th grade. Payne still had an outstanding senior year on the Diamond compiling a .463 batting average with 8 home runs.

College career
After graduating from high school, Payne headed a few miles south to the campus on the bayou, University Louisiana of Monroe. With ULM being the only Division 1 school that recruited Payne, he came in with a chip on his shoulder. Payne emerged into a high-performing playmaker his freshman year and was named “Sun Belt Conference Freshman of the Year” after rushing for 976 yards, 6 touchdowns, catching 41 passes for 488 yards and 3 touchdowns.

Payne's sophomore year was plagued with multiple injuries—the worst causing him to miss the last 3 games of the season, enduring a broken arm, which would need surgery. Payne's would be faced with an ultimatum in his junior year, being asked to move to the defensive side of the ball to play the position of safety. Payne was an all-state linebacker in high school but never played the safety position, posing as a challenge for him. Payne admits the new task he was given was somewhat unsettling, but determining to live out his dream and become an NFL player no matter the cost, Payne stepped up to the challenge and emerged as the starting strong safety his junior year, as he posted 87 tackles with 7 pass deflections and made 2nd Team All Conference.

As a senior, Payne became known as Mr. Handyman, as he was all over the field for the ULM Warhawks, making his senior year one of his most impressive and successful. Payne victoriously led the team with 98 tackles 4 interceptions, averaged 40.9 yards as the starting punter, and averaged 28 yards on the kickoff return. Payne earned 1st Team All Conference, 1st Team All Louisiana.

Professional career

Pre-draft

Chicago Bears
On April 29, 2007, the Chicago Bears made Payne their 5th pick in the NFL draft. By the 4th game of his rookie season Payne was called upon to be the starter, unfortunately, he suffered a season-ending injury in the 2nd quarter breaking his right arm for the 2nd time in his football career, which led to having surgery, and being placed on injured reserve. 
Payne came back for his 2nd season stronger than ever and was named the starting strong safety on opening day. In 2008, Payne won big on the field for the Bears. Payne had a very promising season starting all 16 games—the first 12 at strong safety and the final four at free safety emerging as a play maker for the Bears. In 2008 Payne led the Bears with four interceptions and finished with 88 tackles. Payne had a great season but would spend his entire off-season rehabilitating from surgery on a torn labrum he sustained in the last game of the year. 
Payne spent most of his 3rd year battling neck and back injuries and missing three games due to lacerated kidneys. In 2009, Payne played in 13 games and started 5. He finished with 46 tackles and five passes deflected. In the off-season, Payne would be traded to the St. Louis Rams.

St. Louis Rams
On April 28, 2010, Payne was traded to the St. Louis Rams. With the Rams Payne was having one of his best off-season as an NFL player; rotating with the 1st team defense and making plays, but was hit with a season-ending injury tearing his PCL in the last preseason game. Payne was placed on injured reserve then released a few days later.

Carolina Panthers
After rehabbing and missing all of the 2010 season, the Carolina Panthers would pick up Payne on July 29, 2011. After suffering a concussion in the first preseason game, Payne would miss the next 2 games. Payne was cleared and played the final preseason game, which would be his last game in the NFL. He was released on September 4.

External links
Chicago Bears bio
Kevin's Blog on LockerBlogger

References

1983 births
Living people
People from El Dorado, Arkansas
Players of American football from Arkansas
American football safeties
Louisiana–Monroe Warhawks football players
Chicago Bears players
St. Louis Rams players
Carolina Panthers players